In Greek mythology, Antissa (Ancient Greek: Ἄντισσα) was a princess of Lesbos as the daughter of King Macar and sister to Methymna, Mytilene, Agamede, Arisbe and Issa. Her brothers were Cydrolaus, Neandrus, Leucippus and Eresus. She was the eponym of the city Antissa on the said island. In some account, Antissa was claimed to be Macareus' wife instead.

Note

References 

 Diodorus Siculus, The Library of History translated by Charles Henry Oldfather. Twelve volumes. Loeb Classical Library. Cambridge, Massachusetts: Harvard University Press; London: William Heinemann, Ltd. 1989. Vol. 3. Books 4.59–8. Online version at Bill Thayer's Web Site
 Diodorus Siculus, Bibliotheca Historica. Vol 1-2. Immanel Bekker. Ludwig Dindorf. Friedrich Vogel. in aedibus B. G. Teubneri. Leipzig. 1888–1890. Greek text available at the Perseus Digital Library.
 Stephanus of Byzantium, Stephani Byzantii Ethnicorum quae supersunt, edited by August Meineike (1790–1870), published 1849. A few entries from this important ancient handbook of place names have been translated by Brady Kiesling. Online version at the Topos Text Project.

Princesses in Greek mythology